St. Joseph the Betrothed Ukrainian Greek-Catholic Church is a Ukrainian church located in Chicago and belonging to the St. Nicholas Eparchy for the Ukrainian Catholics. The building has an ultra-modern roof, comprising thirteen gold domes which symbolize the twelve apostles and Jesus Christ as the largest center dome.

Church building

Interior 
The interior of the church is adorned with Byzantine style icons (frescoes).

Relief geometric patterns of crosses are etched into the walls of the second story of the current structure.  The underlying materials from which the crosser were made was left visible until in 1996 and 1997 pastor Fr. Pavlo Hayda had them painted, and the gold domes restored. The iconostasis inside the church is a traditional Byzantine iconostasis with two tiers and is in the Modern Cossack Baroque Style.

In the rear, on the west end of the altar server and priest sacristy, is the diminutive St. Paraskevia Chapel, named after the saint from whom Fr. Shary's (see History) mother took her name. Daily morning services take place here, and the main sanctuary is used for celebrating Divine Liturgies on Saturdays, Sundays, and high holy days. The iconostasis in the chapel is the original for the church on this site.

Grotto 
Across the way from the church is a grotto Shrine dedicated to Our Lady of Hoshiv with an altar sometimes used for outdoor services (such as Pascha Blessing). In 2006, Fr. Pavlo's wife, Christine, led a restoration and relandscaping of the grotto into a memorial garden, which is now dedicated to deceased parishioners.

History 
In August 1956, Archbishop Constantine Bohachevsky appointed Fr. Joseph Shary to organize a new community.  The first two Liturgies were celebrated at St. Patrick's High School Auditorium, with the first church being built at its current location.  This building stands north of the current church building and is used as a Parish Life Center that houses offices, classrooms, and a hall.  It is also home to the Selfreliance Ukrainian American Federal Credit Union's northwest branch.

As the community expanded, Fr. Shary realized the parish needed a larger facility.  He saw this as an opportunity to build what he termed a church for "The Glory of God and Future Generations." The church, designed by architect Zenon Mazurkevich of Philadelphia and constructed by Walter Bratkiv of REM Builders, Inc., was dedicated and consecrated by Bishop Jaroslav Gabro on May 22, 1977.

Milestones
The history of St. Joseph begins with Bishop Constantine Bohachevsky, Metropolitan of the Ukrainian Archeparchy of Philadelphia officially establishing St. Joseph Ukrainian Catholic Church on August 1, 1956.  Father Joseph Shary was sent here as the organizing pastor, who upon his arrival in Chicago was met with an energetic group of Ukrainian Catholics anxious to expand the Chicago Ukrainian religious community into the Northwest Side.

Timeline
On August 21, 1956, Cardinal Samuel Stritch, permitted the parish to use St. Patrick's Christian Brothers High School facilities on Belmont Avenue, until the newly formed parish was financially in a position to purchase land to build a church.  Stritch promised all possible assistance in this endeavor.

In 1958, building began on Cumberland Avenue.  The upper portion became the church, with the addition of pews, altars and other appropriate furnishings, which were gifts from Immaculate Heart of Mary Parish.

The lower hall became the hub of cultural, social and fund-raising functions, such as parish praznyks, sviachenes, bake sales, choir rehearsals, rummage sales, children's programs, Ukrainian dance lessons, dances, and countless other activities.

On October 1, 1975, construction of the new church edifice began.

On May 22, 1977, Bishop Jaroslav Gabro dedicated the church.

The large rock near the entrance ramp attracted attention to the church.  It is a piece of the Canadian Shield brought to the new church's building site.  It was retrieved by the contractors during excavation of the foundation.  The pastor saved it and had it placed in its present position after construction was completed in 1976.

In 1988, a hand-carved iconostasis, designed in the Byzantine-Ukrainian tradition by Borys Makarenko, was installed in the church.

The Altar Rosary Society (ARS) has promoted various Ukrainian cultural and social activities, bringing the various components of the society together. When the church was erected, the Altar Rosary Society covered the cost of the installation of the marble floor and apsidial wall.  They also sponsored the royal throne, the altars, and the tabernacle.  Additionally they provided and maintained the altar linens and many of the vestments. To raise this money, the Altar Rosary Society sponsored fashion shows, bake sales, yearly pascha sale, turkey raffles, bazaars, white-elephant sales, family picnics.  Additionally, the members staffed the kitchen, and equipped the church hall kitchen for dinners, picnics, carnivals, breakfasts and other activities.

St. Joseph Church Choir was established in August 1956.

For one and a half years, the choir was trained and directed by Father Shary. Julian Pozniak, a qualified and trained cantor and experienced choir director, remained the sole director and cantor for St. Joseph’s until his retirement.  Jaroslav Stefaniuk, with Julian Pozniak's guidance, became choir director and cantor, until his death in March 2006.

Each Sunday the choir sang Divine Liturgy, caroled at Christmas time, and sang at various functions and events throughout the year. Performances took place for the Ukrainian community, but at religious and secular venues, such as the Museum of Science and Industry.

St. Joseph's choir joined with the St. Nicholas Cathedral Slavuta choir to become known as the Metropolitan Andrej Sheptytsky Choir of Chicago.  The choir recorded an album of a newly commissioned composition of the Divine Liturgy, by Andrij Hnatyshyn.  One of the most momentous performances by the choir was for the visit of Pope John Paul II in Grant Park, in 1979.

The Acres of Fun Festivals, and the Friday night Bingos, along with the Pyrohy sales were major fundraisers for the parish, due in large part to the parish volunteers.

Many young parishioners were in the Sts. Cyril and Methodious Youth Group, were altar servers, orboth.  They volunteered at parish events, as well as participating in liturgical services.  They volunteered in soup kitchens, participated in retreats and organized citywide youth nights.

Priests over the years 
Many of the presiding priests were assigned to St. Joseph Parish while only in their twenties. The first pastor was Fr. Joseph Shary, after whom the parish is named, along with St. Josaphat in Munster, Indiana.

Pastors
 Rev. Joseph Shary	 1956-1982
 Msgr. William Bilinsky	 1982-1983
 Rev. Andriy Chirovsky	 1983-1985
 Rev. Mykhajlo Kuzma	 1985-1987
 Msgr. William Bilinsky	 1987-1995
 Rev. Pavlo Hayda	 1995-2007
 Rev. Mykola Buryadnyk  2008–Present

Current priests 

Fr. Mykola Buryadnyk (2009–Present) - Pastor
Fr. Mykola Buryadnyk was assigned as pastor of St. Joseph parish in February 2008. Since he came to the parish, he helped establish and revitalize several parish organizations such as the Ukrainian Language Bible study Group, the martial arts school of Combat Hopak, the Vyshyvanka School of Dance, and the Homin Theater Group. Fr. Mykola, along with his pastoral ministry, also led the church's roof repairs and gold leaf reapplication the church's interior.

Fr. Volodymyr Kushnir (2010–Present)
Fr. Volodymyr was ordained to the priesthood in October 2009.  He is married to Oksana (Mendiuk), and they have a daughter Olya, who was born in 2004.  He was assigned to St. Joseph parish, as associate, in 2010.

Gallery

External links

Official website
 Photo slideshow of St. Joseph Church, Christmas 2009
 Ukrainian Catholic Eparchy of Saint Nicholas of Chicago
 List of the 10 most unique churches in the world

Ukrainian Catholic Metropolia of Philadelphia
Eastern Catholic churches in Illinois
Ukrainian Catholic churches in the United States
Joseph the Betrothed Church
Joseph the Betrothed Church
Christian organizations established in 1956
Rusyn-American culture in Illinois
Church buildings with domes